The 1850–51 United States House of Representatives elections were held on various dates in various states between August 5, 1850 and November 4, 1851. Each state set its own date for its elections to the House of Representatives before the first session of the 32nd United States Congress convened on December 1, 1851. Elections were held for all 233 seats, representing 31 states.

were held at various dates in different states from August 1850 to November 1851. The Democrats gained 17 seats, increasing their majority relative to the rival Whigs, who lost 22 seats. Incumbent Whig President Millard Fillmore, who succeeded to the Presidency in July 1850 after the death of more charismatic General Zachary Taylor, lacked a strong political base. The Compromise of 1850, which admitted California alone as a free state in exchange for concessions to slave state interests, began integration of the Mexican Cession. It appeared in the short term that Congress had politically feasible options to contain sectionalism and to reduce tensions over expanding slavery in the West. This optimism soon would prove unfounded.

The Unionist Party, formed in support of the Compromise of 1850, gained 10 seats in the South, as did the States' Rights Party. The Free Soil Party, which opposed the expansion of slavery into the Western territories, lost five seats and was reduced to four Representatives, all in New England.

Election summaries

One district in Massachusetts had been vacant in the 31st Congress.  No new seats were added.

The previous election had 1 Know-Nothing and 1 Independent.

Special elections

31st Congress 
 : 1850
 : 1850
 : 1851
 : 1850
 : 1850

32nd Congress

Alabama 

Elections were held August 4, 1851, after the March 4, 1851 beginning of the term, but before the House first convened in December 1851.

|-
! 

|-
! 

|-
! 

|-
! 

|-
! 

|-
! 

|-
! 

|}

Arkansas 

The election was held August 4, 1851, after the March 4, 1851 beginning of the term, but before the House first convened in December 1851.

|-
! 

|}

California 

California's members were elected late, at-large statewide, September 3, 1851.  There were nevertheless seated with the rest of the House at the beginning of the first session.

|-
! rowspan=2 | 
| George W. Wright
|  | Independent
| 1849
|  | Incumbent retired.New member elected.Democratic gain.
| rowspan=2 nowrap | 

|-
| Edward Gilbert
|  | Democratic
| 1849
|  | Incumbent retired.New member elected.Democratic hold.
|}

Connecticut 

Elections were held April 7, 1851, after the March 4, 1851 beginning of the term, but before the House first convened in December 1851.

|-
! 

|-
! 

|-
! 

|-
! 

|}

Delaware 

The election was held November 12, 1850.

|-
! 

|}

Florida 

The election was held October 7, 1850.

|-
! 

|}

Georgia 

Elections were held October 6, 1851.

|-
! 

|-
! 

|-
! 

|-
! 

|-
! 

|-
! 

|-
! 

|-
! 

|}

Illinois 

Elections were held November 5, 1850.

|-
! 

|-
! 

|-
! 

|-
! 

|-
! 

|-
! 

|-
! 

|}

Indiana 

Elections were held August 4, 1851, after the March 4, 1851 beginning of the term, but before the House first convened in December 1851.

|-
! 

|-
! 

|-
! 

|-
! 

|-
! 

|-
! 

|-
! 

|-
! 

|-
! 

|-
! 

|}

Iowa 

Elections were held August 5, 1850.

|-
! 

|-
! 

|}

Kentucky 

Elections were held August 4, 1851, after the March 4, 1851 beginning of the term, but before the House first convened in December 1851.

|-
! 

|-
! 

|-
! 

|-
! 

|-
! 

|-
! 

|-
! 

|-
! 

|-
! 

|-
! 

|}

Louisiana 

Elections were held November 4, 1851, after the March 4, 1851 beginning of the term, but before the House first convened in December 1851.

|-
! 

|-
! 

|-
! 

|-
! 

|}

Maine 

Elections were held September 9, 1850.

|-
! 

|-
! 

|-
! 

|-
! 

|-
! 

|-
! 

|-
! 

|}

Maryland 

Elections were held October 1, 1851 elections were after the March 4, 1851 beginning of the new term, but still before the Congress convened in December 1851.

|-
! 

|-
! 

|-
! 

|-
! 

|-
! 

|-
! 

|}

Massachusetts 

Elections were held November 11, 1850, but at least one district's elections went to multiple ballots into 1851.

|-
! 

|-
! 

|-
! 

|-
! 
| colspan=3 | Vacant due to failure to elect.
|  | New member elected on the 4th ballot.Whig gain.
| nowrap | 

|-
! 

|-
! 

|-
! 
| Julius Rockwell
|  | Whig
| 1844 
|  | Incumbent lost re-election.New member elected on the fourth ballot.Whig hold.
| nowrap | 

|-
! 

|-
! 

|-
! 

|}

Michigan 

Elections were held November 5, 1850.

|-
! 
| Alexander W. Buel
| 
| 1848
|  | Incumbent lost re-election.New member elected.Whig gain.
| nowrap | 

|-
! 
| William Sprague
|  | Whig
| 1848
|  | Incumbent retired.New member elected.Democratic gain.
| nowrap | 

|-
! 
| Kinsley S. Bingham
| 
| 1846
|  | Incumbent retired.New member elected.Whig gain.
| nowrap | 

|}

Minnesota Territory 
See Non-voting delegates, below.

Mississippi 

Elections were held November 3–4, 1851, after the March 4, 1851 beginning of the term, but before the House first convened in December 1851.

|-
! 
| Jacob Thompson
|  | Democratic
| 1839
|  | Incumbent lost re-election as a Southern Rights candidate.New member elected.Unionist gain. 
| nowrap | 

|-
! 
| Winfield S. Featherston
|  | Democratic
| 1847
|  | Incumbent lost re-election as a Southern Rights candidate.New member elected.Unionist gain. 
| nowrap | 

|-
! 
| William McWillie
|  | Democratic
| 1849
|  | Incumbent lost re-election as a Southern Rights candidate.New member elected.Unionist gain. 
| nowrap | 

|-
! 
| Albert G. Brown
|  | Democratic
| 1847
|  | Incumbent re-elected.Southern Rights gain. 
| nowrap | 

|}

Missouri 

Elections were held August 5, 1850.

|-
! 

|-
! 

|-
! 

|-
! 

|-
! 

|}

New Hampshire 

Elections were held March 11, 1851, after the March 4, 1851 beginning of the term, but before the House first convened in December 1851.

|-
! 

|-
! 

|-
! 

|-
! 

|}

New Jersey 

Elections were held November 5, 1850.

|-
! 

|-
! 

|-
! 

|-
! 

|-
! 

|}

New Mexico Territory 
See Non-voting delegates, below.

New York 

Elections were held November 5, 1850.

|-
! 

|-
! 

|-
! 

|-
! 

|-
! 

|-
! 

|-
! 

|-
! 

|-
! 

|-
! 

|-
! 

|-
! 

|-
! 

|-
! 

|-
! 

|-
! 

|-
! 

|-
! 

|-
! 

|-
! 

|-
! 

|-
! 

|-
! 

|-
! 

|-
! 

|-
! 

|-
! 

|-
! 

|-
! 

|-
! 

|-
! 

|-
! 

|-
! 

|-
! 

|}

North Carolina 

Elections were held August 7, 1851, after the March 4, 1851 beginning of the term, but before the House first convened in December 1851.

|-
! 

|-
! 

|-
! 

|-
! 

|-
! 

|-
! 

|-
! 

|-
! 

|-
! 

|}

Ohio 

Elections were held October 8, 1850.

|-
! 

|-
! 

|-
! 

|-
! 

|-
! 

|-
! 

|-
! 

|-
! 

|-
! 

|-
! 

|-
! 

|-
! 

|-
! 

|-
! 

|-
! 

|-
! 

|-
! 

|-
! 

|-
! 

|-
! 

|-
! 

|}

Oregon Territory 
See Non-voting delegates, below.

Pennsylvania 

Elections were held October 8, 1850.

|-
! 

|-
! 

|-
! 

|-
! 

|-
! 

|-
! 

|-
! 

|-
! 

|-
! 

|-
! 

|-
! 

|-
! 

|-
! 

|-
! 

|-
! 

|-
! 

|-
! 

|-
! 

|-
! 

|-
! 

|-
! 

|-
! 

|-
! 

|-
! 

|}

Rhode Island 

Elections were held April 2, 1851, after the March 4, 1851 beginning of the term, but before the House first convened in December 1851.

|-
! 

|-
! 

|}

South Carolina 

Elections were held October 14–15, 1850.

|-
! 

|-
! 

|-
! 

|-
! 

|-
! 

|-
! 

|-
! 

|}

Tennessee 

Elections were held August 7, 1851, after the March 4, 1851 beginning of the term, but before the House first convened in December 1851.

|-
! 
| Andrew Johnson
|  | Democratic
| 1842
| Incumbent re-elected.
| nowrap | 

|-
! 
| Albert G. Watkins
|  | Whig
| 1849
| Incumbent re-elected.
| nowrap | 

|-
! 
| Josiah M. Anderson
|  | Whig
| 1849
|  |Incumbent lost re-election.New member elected.Democratic gain.
| nowrap | 

|-
! 
| John H. Savage
|  | Democratic
| 1849
| Incumbent re-elected.
| nowrap | 

|-
! 
| George W. Jones
|  | Democratic
| 1842
| Incumbent re-elected.
| nowrap |  George W. Jones (Democratic) 100%

|-
! 
| James H. Thomas
|  | Democratic
| 1847
|  |Incumbent lost re-election.New member elected.Independent Democratic gain.
| nowrap | 

|-
! 
| Meredith P. Gentry
|  | Whig
| 1845
| Incumbent re-elected.
| nowrap |  Meredith P. Gentry (Whig) 100%

|-
! 
| Andrew Ewing
|  | Democratic
| 1849
|  |Incumbent retired.New member elected.Whig gain.
| nowrap | 

|-
! 
| Isham G. Harris
|  | Democratic
| 1849
| Incumbent re-elected.
| nowrap | 

|-
! 
| Frederick P. Stanton
|  | Democratic
| 1845
| Incumbent re-elected.
| nowrap | 

|-
! 
| Christopher H. Williams
|  | Whig
| 1849 
| Incumbent re-elected.
| nowrap |  Christopher H. Williams (Whig) 100%

|}

Texas 

Elections were held August 4, 1851, after the March 4, 1851 beginning of the term, but before the House first convened in December 1851.

|-
! 

|-
! 

|}

Utah Territory 
See Non-voting delegates, below.

Vermont 

Elections were held September 3, 1850.

|-
! 

|-
! 

|-
! 

|-
! 

|}

Virginia 

Elections were held October 23, 1851, after the March 4, 1851 beginning of the term, but before the House first convened in December 1851.

|-
! 

|-
! 

|-
! 

|-
! 

|-
! 

|-
! 

|-
! 

|-
! 

|-
! 

|-
! 

|-
! 

|-
! 

|-
! 

|-
! 

|-
! 

|}

Wisconsin 

Elections were held November 5, 1850.

|-
! 
| Charles Durkee
|  | Free Soil
| 1848
| Incumbent re-elected.
| nowrap | 
|-
! 
| Orsamus Cole
|  | Whig
| 1848
|  | Incumbent lost re-election.New member elected.Democratic gain.
| nowrap | 
|-
! 
| James Duane Doty
|  | Democratic
| 1848
|  | Incumbent won re-election as an Independent.Independent Democratic gain.
| nowrap | 
|}

Non-voting delegates 

|-
! 
| Henry Hastings Sibley
|  | Democratic
| 1848 1849 1849 
| Incumbent re-elected.
| nowrap | 

|-
! 
| colspan=3 | New seat
|  | New seat created.New delegate elected.Democratic gain.
| nowrap | 

|-
! 
| Samuel Thurston
|  | Democratic
| 1849 
|  | Incumbent died April 9, 1851.New delegate elected June 2, 1851.Democratic hold.
| nowrap | 

|-
! 
| colspan=3 | New seat
|  | New seat created.New delegate elected.Independent gain.
| nowrap | 

|}

See also
 1850 United States elections
 List of United States House of Representatives elections (1824–1854)
 1850–51 United States Senate elections
 31st United States Congress
 32nd United States Congress

Notes

References

Bibliography

External links
 Office of the Historian (Office of Art & Archives, Office of the Clerk, U.S. House of Representatives)